This is a list of female metal artists with articles on Wikipedia. For female singers of other rock genres, see List of female rock singers.

A

Lee Aaron
Anza (Head Phones President)
Maria Arkhipova "Masha Scream" (Arkona)
Anita Auglend (The Sins of Thy Beloved)

B

Tairrie B (My Ruin, Tura Satana, Manhole)
Sevi Bliznakova (SEVI)
Ann Boleyn (Hellion)
Steffanie Borges (Steffanie, Show-Ya)
Marcela Bovio (Stream of Passion, MaYaN, Ayreon, Elfonia)
Fallon Bowman (Kittie)
Maria Brink (In This Moment)
Amalie Bruun (Myrkur)

C

Cadaveria (Opera IX, Cadaveria)
Cassiopée (Anemonia)
Francesca Chiara (The LoveCrave)
Ji-In Cho (Krypteria)
Lucia Cifarelli (KMFDM, Drill)
Sabina Classen (Holy Moses)
Dorthia Cottrell (Windhand)
Dawn Crosby (Detente, Fear of God)
Cherie Currie (The Runaways)
Julie Christmas (Made Out of Babies, Battle of Mice, Spylacopa)

D

Clémentine Delauney (Visions of Atlantis, Serenity, Whyzdom, Exit Eden)
Sharon den Adel (Within Temptation, Ayreon)
Sarah Jezebel Deva (Angtoria, Cradle of Filth, Therion, The Kovenant)

E

Aimee Echo (Human Waste Project, TheStart)
Ann-Mari Edvardsen (The 3rd and the Mortal, Tactile Gemma)
Eilera (Chrysalis)
Liv Kristine Espenæs (Theatre of Tragedy, Leaves' Eyes, The Sirens)

F

Şebnem Ferah (Volvox)
Melissa Ferlaak (Aesma Daeva, Visions of Atlantis, Echoterra)
Jennifer Finch (L7)
Lita Ford (The Runaways, Lita Ford band)
Veronica Freeman (Benedictum)
Jessi Frey (Velcra)

G

Runhild Gammelsæter (Thorr's Hammer, Khlyst)
Janet Gardner (Vixen)
Suzi Gardner (L7)
Pilar Giménez "Ailyn" (Sirenia)
Kimberly Goss (Sinergy, Ancient, Therion)
Angela Gossow (Arch Enemy)
Jacqueline Govaert (Ayreon)
Giorgia Gueglio (Mastercastle)

H

Lzzy Hale (Halestorm)
Gigi Hangach (Phantom Blue)
Lauren Harris (Six Hour Sundown, Lauren Harris)
Carla Harvey (Butcher Babies)
Laurie Ann Haus (Rain Fell Within, Autumn Tears)
Hannah Holgersson (Therion)
Slymenstra Hymen (Gwar)

I
Ihriel (Peccatum)

J

Floor Jansen (ReVamp, After Forever, Ayreon, Nightwish)
Irene Jansen (Ayreon, Star One)
Jill Janus (Huntress, The Starbreakers, Chelsea Girls)
Jessicka (Jack Off Jill, Scarling.)
Kelly Johnson (Girlschool)

K

Vena Kava (Killing Moon)
Moa Kikuchi (Babymetal)
Aja Kim (The Iron Maidens)
Gaby Koss (Hagard, Nota Profana)
Manuela Kraller (Haggard, Xandria, Nagor Mar)
Anna Kränzlein (Schandmaul)
Eileen Küpper (Therion, The Kovenant)

L

Lana Lane (Lana Lane, Ayreon)
Courtney LaPlante (Spiritbox)
Leah (solo, Dragonlord)
Jen Ledger (Skillet)
Amy Lee (Evanescence)
Leather Leone (Chastain)
Lori Lewis (Therion, Aesma Daeva)
Sara Löfgren (TWDSO)
Kristell Lowagie (Valkyre)
Magali Luyten (Virus IV, Beautiful Sin, Ayreon)
Stephanie Luzie (Darkwell, Atargatis)

M

Laura Macrì (MaYaN)
Mākii (High and Mighty Color)
Elisa Martin (Dark Moor, Fairyland, Dreamaker)
Helena Iren Michaelsen (Trail of Tears, Imperia, Angel)
Lisa Middelhauve (Xandria, Whyzdom)
Mie (Animetal Lady)
Yui Mizuno (Babymetal)
Taylor Momsen (The Pretty Reckless)
Anna Murphy (Eluveitie, Cellar Darling)

N

Suzuka Nakamoto (Babymetal)
Sandra Nasić (Guano Apes)
Maxi Nil (Visions of Atlantis, Elysion, On Thorns I Lay, Jaded Star)
Anne Nurmi (Lacrimosa)

O

Deb Obarski (The Iron Maidens)
Kazuha Oda (Kazha)
Anette Olzon (Nightwish, Alyson Avenue, The Dark Element)
Manda Ophuis (Nemesea)
Orianthi
Nina Osegueda (A Sound of Thunder)

P

Kobra Paige (Kobra and the Lotus)
Heidi Parviainen (Amberian Dawn, Dark Sarah)
Monika Pedersen (Sirenia, Sinphonia)
Doro Pesch (Warlock, Doro)
Vicky Psarakis (The Agonist)

R

Kirsten Rosenberg (The Iron Maidens)
Kari Rueslåtten (The 3rd and the Mortal, Storm, The Sirens)
Patti Russo (Trans-Siberian Orchestra)
Elize Ryd (Amaranthe, Kamelot)
Angelica Rylin (The Murder of My Sweet)

S

Lori S. (Acid King)
Sabrina Sabrok (Primeras Impressiones)
Cristina Scabbia (Lacuna Coil)
Elizabeth Schall (Dreaming Dead)
Sandra Schleret (Dreams of Sanity, Siegfried, Elis)
Otep Shamaya (Otep)
Nell Sigland (The Crest, Theatre of Tragedy)
Elina Siirala (Leaves Eyes, Angel Nation)
Simone Simons (Epica, Aina, Kamelot, Ayreon)
Skin (Skunk Anansie)
Shawnee Smith (Fydolla Ho)
Carly Smithson (We Are the Fallen)
Amanda Somerville (Aina, HDK, Trillium, Avantasia, Docker's Guild, Kiske/Somerville, Epica, Exit Eden)
Sara Squadrani (Ancient Bards)
Vibeke Stene (Tristania, God Of Atheists)
Lacey Sturm (Flyleaf)
Sever (Sumo Cyco)
Juliet Simms (Lilith Czar)

T

Keiko Terada (Show-Ya)
Katherine "The Great Kat" Thomas (The Great Kat)
Tarja Turunen (Nightwish, Tarja)

V

Anneke van Giersbergen (The Gathering, Agua De Annique, VUUR, Ayreon, The Sirens, The Devin Townsend Project, The Gentle Storm)
Dianne van Giersbergen (Xandria, Ex Libris)
Päivi "Capri" Virkkunen (Amberian Dawn)

W

Jenny Warren (The Iron Maidens)
Quinn Weng (Seraphim)
Silje Wergeland (Octavia Sperati, The Gathering)
Charlotte Wessels (Delain)
Alissa White-Gluz (The Agonist, Arch Enemy)
Wendy O. Williams (The Plasmatics)

Z

Emmanuelle Zoldan (Sirenia)

See also
 List of female rock singers

References

External links
 List of Female Black Metal Musicians

 
Heavy metal
Heavy metal
Lists of heavy metal bands